Supreme Leader Representation in Universities (organization) is an Iranian religious/cultural institute which has been formed by the decree of Iran's supreme leader, Seyyed Ali Khamenei. It was organized based on the final decision of the Supreme-Council of the Cultural Revolution in March 1993 in order to establish a new institute to fulfill the scriptures of supreme-leader's goals and according to its determined scopes/duties, which do specified obligations based on its written statute.

Amongst the targets of this organization are to make religious-universities in order to explain Islamic-values and ... of students and academics. The head of the Supreme Leader Representation in Universities is appointed by the supreme-leader. Mostafa Rostami is the new appointed head of the organization who has been determined on 3 September 2018 instead of Mohammad Mohammadian by Seyyed Ali Khamenei.

See also 
 List of organizations under control of the Supreme Leader of Iran
 Supreme Council of the Cultural Revolution

References

Organisations under control of the Supreme Leader of Iran
Organizations established in 1994
Islamic organisations based in Iran
Organisations based in Tehran
Revolutionary institutions of the Islamic Republic of Iran